Nico Marquardt (born May 24, 1994 in Potsdam) is a German politician, non-executive director and consultant. At the age of 13, he became internationally known with his astronomy research work entitled The Killer Asteroid 99942 Apophis.

Life

Early life 
Nico Marquardt was born in Potsdam, Germany as the son of Oberstleutnant (commissioned officer) Harald Broh and nurse Apolonia Marquardt and attended the Humboldt High School in Potsdam.

Astronomy 
In April 2008, at the age of 13, he took part in the competition Jugend forscht with his research paper The Killer Asteroid 99942 Apophis, in which he calculated the probability for the asteroid Apophis to collide with a geosynchronous satellite and the consequences of this event to the likelihood of an Earth collision. On the day of the award Marquardt was interviewed by German newspaper Bild which published an article stating a 100-times higher probability of an Earth-collision in the year 2036 than Marquardt calculated. Afterwards, nearly all international press reported the news with false data caused by the review from Bild even though Marquardt denied it. Marquardt used this global attention and ever since became one of the globally most influential Twitter users in science. 

The astronomer Fred Watson said that "Marquardt has done a marvellous job. A hundred years ago people used logarithms and hand-calculators and slide rules to work out asteroid orbits. But it says a lot for the world that we live in that a 13 year-old schoolboy can download the right software to do the job and actually find errors in NASA's work. It is quite extraordinary."

Career 
Since January 2013 Marquardt acts as the Global Advisor for Social Media at Mars One and CEO of the consulting firm Rabbit. As of August 2014 Marquardt has been elected as non-executive director of the local energy and water service company EWP.

Political career
During his final year in high school, Marquardt ran for office in Potsdam as a candidate for the Social Democratic Party of Germany and won. Marquardt is the youngest elected politician of any state capital in Germany. In November 2015 Marquardt filed criminal charges against the far-right political party Der Dritte Weg (German for "The Third Path") in Germany on grounds of incitement to hatred.

Awards
Marquardt won the first prize at the German competition Jugend forscht, got the Special Honor from the Federal Ministry of Education and Research and the Special Award of the German Aerospace Center.

References

External links 
 Official Website
 

Reports about Nico Marquardt
 
 
 
 
 
 
 

1994 births
People from Potsdam
Living people
Social Democratic Party of Germany politicians